The Kalanga or Bakalanga are a southern Bantu ethnic group mainly inhabiting Matebeleland in Zimbabwe, northeastern Botswana and Limpopo Province in South Africa. They are historically related to the Nambya, Karanga, Bapedi and Venda.

Current day BaKalanga people are descendants of the Leopard Kopje’s people who greatly influenced civilization in the Southern sphere of the African continent. BaKalanga history shows and tells us that they are the builders of the Mapungubwe Empire which was Southern Africa’s first uniform Kingdom. From Mapungubwe they were also part of the Karanga Kingdom of Great Zimbabwe (Nzimabwe,or Nzi we Mabwe-TjiKalanga language). Upon the fall of the Great Zimbabwe Kingdom they went on to build the Khami ruins found in today’s Matebeleland Province in Zimbabwe and lastly proceeded on to occupy the Domboshaba (Botswana) and Njelele (Zimbabwe) shrines. Kalanga people also believe in rainmaking rites like their BaLobedu and VhaVenda counterparts as will be discussed below.

The BaKalanga of Botswana are the second largest ethnic group in the country as well as the language being the second most spoken in the country, and only the most spoken in the Northern part of the country. The TjiKalanga language of Zimbabwe is the third most spoken  language in the country, however being recognized as a Western Shona branch of the Shona group of languages and is also used in News Broadcasts, both Television as well as Radio Stations.

Language
The native language of the baKalanga has two varieties: 1) TjiKalanga, or simply Kalanga, in western Zimbabwe, 2) Ikalanga in northeastern Botswana. Together with the Nambya language, these varieties form the western branch of the shona group (Guthrie S.10) that also includes Central Shona.  Kalanga-speakers once numbered over 1,700,000, though they are now much reduced, often speaking Ndebele or Central Shona languages in Zimbabwe, Tswana in Botswana, and other local languages of the surrounding peoples of southern Africa. 

The BaKalanga are one of the largest ethnolinguistic groups in Botswana. The 1946 census indicated that there were 32,777 (40% of the numerically largest district) BaKalanga in the Bamangwato (Central) District.

History 

According to Huffman (2008), the original Bakalanga people descended from Leopard's Kopje farmers. These people occupied areas covering parts of north eastern Botswana, western and southern Zimbabwe, adjacent parts of South Africa and Mozambique by around AD 100. They traded in ivory, furs and feathers with the Indian Ocean coast for goods such as glass beads and cotton clothes. The majority of these prehistoric Bakalanga villages have been discovered in Botswana and Zimbabwe in areas close to major rivers and were usually built on terraced hilltops with stone walls built around them.

The Kalanga are linked to such early African States as Mapungubgwe, Khami, and the Rozvi Empire. The early Bakalanga people living in the Shashe-Limpopo basin monopolised trade due to their access to the Indian Ocean coast. By around AD 1220 a new and more powerful kingdom developed around Mapungubgwe Hill, near Botswana’s border with South Africa. Some of the early Bakalanga people living in the lower Shashe-Limpopo valley probably moved towards or became part of this newly formed kingdom.  But studies of climatic data from the area suggest that a disastrous drought soon struck Mapungubgwe, and the Shashe-Limpopo region was uninhabited between A.D 1300 and 1420, forcing the ordinary population to scatter. Mapungubgwe had become a ghost town by AD 1290. Its golden era lasted no more than 50 years culminating in the rise of Great Zimbabwe.

Later, in the 15th century, the centre of power moved back west, from Great Zimbabwe to Khami/Nkami and in the 17th century to Danan'ombe (Dlodlo). The moves were accompanied by changes of the dominance from one clan to another. In the 17th century, the rozvi established southern BaKalanga became a powerful competitor, controlling most of the mining areas. The Rozvi even repelled Portuguese colonists from some of their inland posts.

History goes to show that a huge number of BaKalanga people moved south in search of greener pastures while another section of the people stayed in the Northern areas. The group that moved South of the Limpopo River to their VhaVenda cousins are now called BaKgalaka or BaLobedu and occupy the areas in the immediate southern areas of the VhuVenda areas.BaLobedu and/or BaKgalaka up to this day still stay in areas adjacent to their cousins found in both Botswana and Zimbabwe. Such areas include the areas around Lephalale(South Africa) as well as Bobirwa and Matsiloje areas in today’s Botswana, also in Beitbridge area in Zimbabwe.

In south-western Zimbabwe (now Matabeleland) and adjacent parts of present-day Botswana, Kalanga states survived for more than another century. The fall of the Kingdom of Butua came as a result of a series of invasions, beginning with the Bangwato Kgosi Kgari's ill-fated incursion of around 1828 and culminating in the onslaught of Mzilikazi's Amandebele.

Finally, the Zimbabwe plateau and Lowveld as well as Botswana basin were subdued to British rule by Cecil Rhodes.

Rain-making
The Kalanga people are known for their rain-making abilities through their Supreme Being Mwali/Ngwali. These abilities have always been a part of the BaKalanga people history as well as all those other related groups. The rain-making has always been the duty of the Hosanna’s or AmaWosana (the high priests in Mwali/Ngwali’s church). The traditional attire of the Kalanga/BaKalanga people clearly shows the importance of rain to BaKalanga. They put on black skirts which represent dark clouds heavy with rain, and the white shirts to represent rain droplets. This is the attire worn when they go and plead for rain at Njelele shrine in Zimbabwe, which is the headquarters for the Hosanna’s of Botswana, South Africa and Zimbabwe.

Bakalanga villages and towns 

Serowe
Shashe-Mooke
Mopipi
Nata-Gweta
Letlhakane
Orapa
Rakops
Changate
Xhumo
Makalamabedi
Tonota
Kandana
Gombalume
Magalanyeza
Tjangula
Gwambe
Mbila
Mabungwe
Bambadzi
Masukwane
Mulambakwena
Tutume
Maitengwe
Nswazwi
Nshakashongwe
Matenge
Makaleng
Tjizwina
Hulela
Mpatane
Mathangwane
Masunga
Gambule
Sekakangwe
Vhukwi
Zwenshambe
Kalakamati
Sinotsi
Matobo
Semitwe
Marapong
Sebina
Butale
Ramokgwebana
Mapoka
Tokwana
Masendu
Nhopemano
 Mafule
Makumbi
Mbimba
Tjolotjo
Masingwaneng
Tsamaya
Mosetse 
Dagwi
Nkange
Senete
Matjinge
Gulubane
Themashanga
Ntoli
Nlapkhwane
Gampo
Khame
Kgari
Moroka
Sechele
Letsholathebe
Kalakamati
Goshwe
Madlambudzi
Ndolwane
Masendu
Bhagani
Makhekhe
Bilingoma
Malebegwa
Sihore
Malalume
Malopa
Bambadzi
Hingwe
Jutjume
Makhulela
Tjehanga
Mbalambi
Lemu
Ngwana
Butshe
Nswazwi 
Gutu
Dombodema 
Hikwa
Male
Tjompani
Sevaka
mafeha
mabhongani
Mathangwane
Makorokoro
Hhobodo
Madabe 
Tjingababili
Mafule

Further reading 
David N. Beach: The Shona and Zimbabwe 900–1850. Heinemann, London 1980 und Mambo Press, Gwelo 1980, 
Catharina Van Waarden: Butua and the end of an era: The effect of the collapse of the Kalanga State on ordinary citizens. An analysis of behaviour under stress.  2012. Cambridge Monographs in African Archaeology 82. Oxford: Archaeopress.

References

External links 
Kalanga Language and Cultural Development Association